Jon H. Else is an American documentary filmmaker and professor at the UC Berkeley Graduate School of Journalism. He directs the documentary program.

Biography
Born in Worcester, Massachusetts, Else moved west for college. He earned a B.A. (English, 1968) from the University of California, Berkeley, and an M.A. (Communication, 1974) from Stanford University.

He directed and produced major documentaries beginning in 1980, with one about the work during World War II at Los Alamos in developing and testing the atomic bomb. Another was about the Exploratorium. In 1987 he made a documentary about the civil rights movement from 1954 to 1965, based on the history of the same name Eyes on the Prize. In 1988 he was awarded a MacArthur Fellowship in 1988.

He created additional documentaries on a wide variety of subjects, as well as working as a writer or cinematographer on Emmy Award-winning works.

Awards
 1988  MacArthur Fellows Program
 1989 Emmy - Yosemite: The Fate Of Heaven, director
 1993 Emmy - The Great Depression, writer
 1998 Emmy - America's Endangered Species: Don't Say Good-bye, cinematographer
 1999 Emmy - Sing Faster: The Stagehands' Ring Cycle
 1999 Sundance Filmmaker's Trophy - Sing Faster: The Stagehands' Ring Cycle

Filmography
 The Day After Trinity: J. Robert Oppenheimer and the Atomic Bomb (1980) 
 Palace Of Delights: The Exploratorium (1982), producer, director, cinematographer
 Eyes On The Prize: America's Civil Rights Years (1987, covering 1954–1965), series producer for PBS and cinematographer
 Yosemite: The Fate Of Heaven (1989, aired in American Experience (season 2)), producer, director, cinematographer
  Eyes on the Prize II: America at the Racial Crossroads 1965–1985 (1990), series producer and cinematographer.
 Wonders Are Many: The Making of Doctor Atomic (2008)
 Cadillac Desert: Water and the American West (1997), director, producer, cinematographer 
 Sing Faster: The Stagehands' Ring Cycle (1999), producer, director, cinematographer
 Open Outcry (2001), producer, director, cinematographer
 The Island President (2011), executive producer

References

Living people
1944 births
American film directors
MacArthur Fellows
Sundance Film Festival award winners
University of California, Berkeley Graduate School of Journalism faculty
UC Berkeley College of Letters and Science alumni
Stanford University alumni